Pajares is a Spanish place-name and surname.

Places
Pajares de Adaja, municipality in the province of Ávila, Castile and León, Spain
Pajares de la Laguna, municipality in the province of Salamanca, Castile and León, Spain
Pajares de la Lampreana, municipality in the province of Zamora, Castile and León, Spain
Pajares de los Oteros, municipality in the province of León, Castile and León, Spain
Pajares Base Tunnel, railway tunnel in Spain, on the AVE line from Valladolid to Gijón
Pajares, parish of Lena, municipality in Spain

Surname
María Felipe y Pajares (1848–1913) Spanish teacher and author
Andrés Pajares (born 1940), Spanish actor
Jacobo María Ynclán Pajares, or Jacobo Ynclán (born 1984), Spanish footballer